Lyria exorata is a species of sea snail, a marine gastropod mollusk in the family Volutidae, the volutes.

Description
The length of the shell attains 90 mm.

Distribution
This marine species was found on the Lord Howe Rise in the Coral Sea.

References

Volutidae
Gastropods described in 1988